Marek Botík (born 28 June 1991) is a Slovak swimmer. He competed in the men's 50 metre breaststroke event at the 2017 World Aquatics Championships.

References

1991 births
Living people
Slovak male swimmers
Place of birth missing (living people)
Male breaststroke swimmers
20th-century Slovak people
21st-century Slovak people